Delpha Sauvé (June 12, 1901 – October 2, 1956) was a Canadian politician.  He was a Member of the Legislative Assembly of Quebec.

Background
He was born near Beauharnois, Montérégie on June 12, 1901.

Political career
Sauvé successfully ran as a Conservative candidate in the district of Beauharnois in the 1935 provincial election.  He was re-elected as a Union Nationale candidate in the 1936 and 1939 elections, but was defeated by Bloc populaire canadien candidate Albert Lemieux in the 1944 election.

Death
He died on October 2, 1956 in Montreal.

References

1901 births
1956 deaths
People from Montérégie
Conservative Party of Quebec MNAs
Union Nationale (Quebec) MNAs